"Move That Dope" (edited version titled as "Move That Doh") is a song by American rapper Future, featuring American singer and rapper Pharrell Williams and fellow American rappers Pusha T, and Casino. It was released on February 6, 2014, as the fourth single from Future's second studio album, Honest. The song peaked at number 46 on the US Billboard Hot 100. It was produced by frequent collaborators Mike Will Made It and P-Nasty. Casino's verse is removed from the radio edit version of the song.

Music video
On March 6, 2014, the music video was released. Both Casino and his verse were not featured in the video. However, the extended version does feature Casino. The video includes cameo appearances by Tyler, The Creator, Schoolboy Q, Mike Will Made It and Wiz Khalifa.

Accolades

(*) designates unordered list.

Awards and nominations

Chart performance
"Move That Dope" peaked at number 46 on the US Billboard Hot 100. It spent a total of 18 weeks on the chart. The song was certified gold by the Recording Industry Association of America (RIAA) for sales of 500,000 digital copies in the United States.

Charts

Weekly charts

Year-end charts

Certifications

References

External links

2014 singles
2014 songs
Future (rapper) songs
Pharrell Williams songs
Pusha T songs
Song recordings produced by Mike Will Made It
Epic Records singles
Songs written by Pusha T
Songs written by Pharrell Williams
Songs written by Future (rapper)
Songs about cannabis
Songs written by Mike Will Made It